Dhok Madad Khan is a town in the Islamabad Capital Territory of Pakistan. It is located at 33° 27' 25N 73° 16' 45E with an altitude of 566 metres (1860 feet).

References 

Union councils of Islamabad Capital Territory